Dines is an extinct town in Sweetwater County, Wyoming, United States.

A post office called Dines was established in 1919, and remained in operation until 1955. The community has the name of one Mr. Dines, a businessperson in the local mining industry.

References

Ghost towns in Wyoming
Landforms of Sweetwater County, Wyoming